Verwood is an unincorporated community in Excel Rural Municipality No. 71, Saskatchewan, Canada. The community previously held the status of a village until December 31, 1954.

History 
When a name was being decided for the village, it was decided to use the name of the first resident that would die. The first person who died was six year old Vera Ann Wood. Vera died from an accident in which her dress caught on fire as she was putting straw into the stove to make her father a cup of tea. She originally survived the incident, but later died from her injuries. In addition to having the village named after her, her death also led to the creation of the Verwood Cemetery on the north side of Hwy 13.

Prior to December 31, 1954, Verwood was incorporated as a village, and was restructured as an unincorporated community under the jurisdiction of the Rural municipality of Excel on that date.

See also 
List of communities in Saskatchewan

References 

Excel No. 71, Saskatchewan
Former villages in Saskatchewan
Unincorporated communities in Saskatchewan
Division No. 3, Saskatchewan